Gambo is a town and designated place in the Canadian province of Newfoundland and Labrador. It is in the northeastern portion of the island of Newfoundland on Freshwater Bay. It is in Division No. 7.

It is the closest town to Mint Brook - the birthplace of Joey Smallwood, former Premier of Newfoundland and last father of confederation.

History 
The name Gambo first appeared in the census of 1857. The name Gambo was said by M.F. Howley, to be a corruption of a Spanish or Portuguese name that meant "bay of does". The first steam driven saw mill in Newfoundland was established here. The first way office was established in 1882 under Waymaster Simeon Osmond.  In 1964 the three separate communities of Dark Cove, Middle Brook, and Gambo were incorporated as one town known as Dark Cove-Middle Brook-Gambo.  In 1980 the town officially changed its name to Gambo.

Geography 
Gambo is in Newfoundland within Subdivision of Division No. 7.

Demographics 

Attractions 
Gambo is known for its Smallwood Days and its Loggers' Sports Festival. One of the most important sights is the Logger's Memorial Park.

Notable people 
Randy Collins
Ursula Kelly
Tom Lush
Peg Norman
Joey Smallwood

See also 
List of cities and towns in Newfoundland and Labrador
List of communities in Newfoundland and Labrador
List of designated places in Newfoundland and Labrador

References 

Designated places in Newfoundland and Labrador
Towns in Newfoundland and Labrador